Samuel Moore Kyle (1801-1890) was Archdeacon of Cork  from 1833 until 1876.

Kyle was the eldest son of BishopSamuel Kyle. He was born in Dublin  and educated at Trinity College, Dublin. He was ordained in 1825 and began his career with a curacy  at Urglin. He was Treasurer of Leighlin from 1828 to 1832 and his appointment as archdeacon.  .

References

Alumni of Trinity College Dublin
Archdeacons of Cork
Christian clergy from Dublin (city)
19th-century Irish Anglican priests
1801 births
1890 deaths